Amstelveenseweg is an Amsterdam Metro station in the south of Amsterdam, Netherlands. The station opened in 1997 and is served by line 50 and 51 (Isolatorweg - Gein & Centraal Station - Isolatorweg).

Amstelveenseweg station is an "important" transit point as the metro crosses several bus and tram lines. Changes to the station and its surroundings were made in 2022 to make transiting easier and safer. The station lies in the south of the city and serves as the metro station for many offices, the VU University Medical Center and Olympic Stadium.

The metro station is only accessible with an OV-chipkaart or GVB Travel Pass.

In January 2012, a gas leak at the metro station halted the tram and metro traffic, as well as all trains between Amsterdam Bijlmer station and Schiphol Airport.

Metro services
50 Isolatorweg - Sloterdijk - Lelylaan - Zuid - RAI - Duivendrecht - Bijlmer ArenA - Holendrecht - Gein
51 Isolatorweg - Sloterdijk - Lelylaan - Zuid - RAI - Amsterdam Amstel - Central Station

Tram services
24 Centraal Station - Muntplein - Weteringcircuit - Stadionweg - Stadionplein - VU Medisch Centrum

Bus services
62 Station Lelylaan - Sloten - Hoofddorpplein - Haarlemmermeer - Stadionplein - VU - Buitenveldert - RAI - Station Amstel
142 Marnixstraat bus station - Amstelveen - Uithoorn - Mijdrecht - Wilnis Express
170 Centraal Station - Marnixstraat bus station - Amstelveen - Uithoorn
172 Centraal Station - Marnixstraat bus station - Amstelveen - Aalsmeer - Kudelstaart
174 Centraal Station - Marnixstraat bus station - Amstelveen - Uithoorn - Mijdrecht - Wilnis
176 Station Zuid - VU - Haarlem
197 Marnixstraat bus station - Leidseplein - Museumplein - Haarlemmermeerstation - Stadionplein - Schiphol Airport
397 Elandsgracht - Museumplein - Schiphol Knooppunt Noord - Schiphol Airport - Hoofddorp - Nieuw-Vennep (P&R)

References

External links
GVB website 

Amsterdam Metro stations
Railway stations opened in 1997